Lincoln Austin Steffens (April 6, 1866 – August 9, 1936) was an American investigative journalist and one of the leading muckrakers of the Progressive Era in the early 20th century. He launched a series of articles in McClure's, called "Tweed Days in St. Louis", that would later be published together in a book titled The Shame of the Cities. He is remembered for investigating corruption in municipal government in American cities and for his leftist values.

Early life
Steffens was born in San Francisco, California, the only son and eldest of four children of Elizabeth Louisa (Symes) Steffens and Joseph Steffens. He was raised largely in Sacramento, the state capital; the Steffens family mansion, a Victorian house on H Street bought from merchant Albert Gallatin in 1887, would become the California Governor's Mansion in 1903.

Steffens attended the Saint Matthew's Episcopal Day School, where he frequently clashed with the school's founder and director, stern disciplinarian, Alfred Lee Brewer. He grduated from the University of California, Berkeley and then went to Europe to study.

Career

Steffens began his journalism career at the New York Commercial Advertiser in the 1890s, before moving to the New York Evening Post. From 1902 to 1906, he became an editor of McClure's magazine, where he became part of a celebrated muckraking trio with Ida Tarbell and Ray Stannard Baker. He specialized in investigating government and political corruption, and two collections of his articles were published as The Shame of the Cities (1904) and The Struggle for Self-Government (1906). He also wrote The Traitor State (1905), which criticized New Jersey for patronizing incorporation. In 1906, he left McClure's, along with Tarbell and Baker, to form The American Magazine.  In The Shame of the Cities, Steffens sought to bring about political reform in urban America by appealing to the emotions of Americans. He tried to provoke outrage with examples of corrupt governments throughout urban America.

From 1914 to 1915 he covered the Mexican Revolution and began to see revolution as preferable to reform. In March 1919, he accompanied William C. Bullitt, a low-level State Department official, on a three-week visit to Soviet Russia and witnessed the "confusing and difficult" process of society in the process of revolutionary change. He wrote that "Soviet Russia was a revolutionary government with an evolutionary plan", enduring "a temporary condition of evil, which is made tolerable by hope and a plan."

After his return, he promoted his view of the Soviet Revolution and in the course of campaigning for U.S. food aid for Russia made his famous remark about the new Soviet society: "I have seen the future, and it works", a phrase he often repeated with many variations.  The title page of his wife Ella Winter's Red Virtue: Human Relationships in the New Russia (Victor Gollancz, 1933) carries this quote.

His enthusiasm for communism soured by the time his memoirs appeared in 1931. The autobiography became a bestseller leading to a short return to prominence for the writer, but Steffens would not be able to capitalize on it as illness cut his lecture tour of America short by 1933. He was a member of the California Writers Project, a New Deal program.

He married the twenty-six-year-old socialist writer Leonore (Ella) Sophie Winter in 1924 and moved to Italy, where their son Peter was born in San Remo. Two years later they relocated to the largest art colony on the Pacific Coast, Carmel-by-the-Sea, California. Ella and Lincoln soon became controversial figures in the leftist politics of the region. When John O’Shea, one of the local artists and a friend of the couple, exhibited his study of "Mr. Steffens’ soul", an image which resembled a grotesque daemon, Lincoln took a certain cynical pride in the drawing and enjoyed the publicity it generated.

 

In 1934, Steffens and Winters helped found the San Francisco Workers' School (later the California Labor School); Steffens also served there as an advisor.

Death

Steffens died of a heart condition on August 9, 1936, in Carmel-by-the-Sea, California.

In 2011 Kevin Baker of The New York Times lamented that "Lincoln Steffens isn’t much remembered today".

Works
Pittsburgh is Hell with the Lid Off (1903) (Painting Jules Guerin/Lincoln Steffens)
The Shame of the Cities (1904), online at the Internet Archive
The Traitor State (1905)
The Struggle for Self-Government (1906), online at the Internet Archive
Upbuilders (1909), online at the Internet Archive
The least of these: a fact story (1910), online at the Internet Archive
Into Mexico and --Out! (1916), online at the Internet Archive
Autobiography of Lincoln Steffens (1931)

In popular culture 
Lincoln Steffens is mentioned in the Danny Devito movie Jack the Bear (1993).  
 
Lincoln Steffens is mentioned in the 1987 novel The Bonfire of the Vanities by Tom Wolfe.

Characters on the American crime drama series City on a Hill, which debuted in 2019, make numerous references to Lincoln Steffens.

The Autobiography of Lincoln Steffens is the favorite book of one of the members of The Group in Mary McCarthy's 1963 novel of the same title.

Autobiography of Lincoln Steffens is mentioned in the Joseph McElroy novel Women and Men.  And it is mentioned as a favorite by Marilyn Monroe in her Autobiography "My Story" (she reads it during the making of 'All About Eve' and is warned by Joseph L Mankiewicz to not tell anyone due to possible Communist ties).

References

Further reading

Primary
 Autobiography of Lincoln Steffens (NY: Harcourt, Brace, 1958)
 The Letters of Lincoln Steffens, edited by Ella Winter and Granville Hicks, 2 vols. (1938)

Secondary
 Goodwin, Doris Kearns, The Bully Pulpit: Theodore Roosevelt, William Howard Taft, and the Golden Age of Journalism (Simon & Schuster, 2013)

 Gorton, Stephanie. Citizen Reporters: S. S. McClure, Ida Tarbell, and the Magazine that Rewrote America. New York: Ecco/HarperCollins, 2020. [https://www.harpercollins.com/9780062796646/citizen-reporters/  online

 Hartshorn, Peter. I Have Seen the Future: A Life of Lincoln Steffens (Counterpoint, 2011)

 Kaplan, Justin, Lincoln Steffens: A Biography (NY: Simon and Schuster, 1974)

 Lasch, Christopher, The American Liberals and the Russian Revolution (NY: Columbia University Press, 1962)

 Schultz, Stanley K. "The Morality of Politics: The Muckrakers' Vision of Democracy," The Journal of American History, 52#3 (1965), 527–547, in JSTOR

 Shapiro, Herbert. "Lincoln Steffens: the muckraker reconsidered." American Journal of Economics and Sociology 31.4 (1972): 427-438.
 Stein, Harry H. "Apprenticing Reporters: Lincoln Steffens on the Evening Post." The Historian 58.2 (1995): 367-382.
 Stein, Harry H. "Lincoln Steffens and the Mexican Revolution." American Journal of Economics and Sociology 34.2 (1975): 197-212. online

External links

 
 Lincoln Steffens' collected journalism at The Archive of American Journalism

1866 births
1936 deaths
American autobiographers
American male journalists
Journalists from California
American political writers
American investigative journalists
Writers from Sacramento, California
Progressive Era in the United States
Reform in the United States
University of California, Berkeley alumni
Writers about the Soviet Union
People from Carmel-by-the-Sea, California
Activists from California
American anti-corruption activists
Burials at Cypress Lawn Memorial Park